The following is a list of the 17 cantons of the Haute-Saône department, in France, following the French canton reorganisation which came into effect in March 2015:

Dampierre-sur-Salon
Gray
Héricourt-1
Héricourt-2
Jussey
Lure-1
Lure-2
Luxeuil-les-Bains
Marnay
Mélisey
Port-sur-Saône
Rioz
Saint-Loup-sur-Semouse
Scey-sur-Saône-et-Saint-Albin
Vesoul-1
Vesoul-2
Villersexel

References